Timothy Peter Van Berkel (born 29 June 1984 in Albury, New South Wales) is an Australian professional triathlete who races primarily in long distance triathlon events.

Career 

Van Berkel grew up in Albury, New South Wales and played Australian Rules Football (AFL). He began training for and competing in triathlons at the age of 18 as a way of staying fit during the AFL off-season. In 2004 and 2005 he competed predominately in Age-Group races Australia.

In 2005 he raced at the World Age Group Championships in Hawaii in the 20- to 24-year category, finishing 9th. That was his last race as an amateur. At the age of 21, Van Berkel was granted a professional license. His first race as a professional was Port Macquarie Half Ironman in October 2005. At this time Van Berkel decided to move to Ballina, New South Wales to be closer to his coach, Grant Giles of Team Aeromax, who was based in Port Macquarie, New South Wales.

In 2007, Van Berkel made his debut at Ironman distance, competing in the Ironman Australia Championships and finishing 7th. In 2008, at 24 years old, Berkel won Ironman Western Australia in 2008, making him the second youngest Ironman Champion, behind Germany's Thomas Hellriegel by 20 days. He won his second Ironman distance event at Challenge Copenhagen in 2010, surpassing Hellreigal's accomplishment of having two Ironman distance wins by three months. In 2011 Van Berkel successfully defended his Challenge Copenhagen title in a closely fought race with Denmark's Jimmy Johnsen. Since turning professional, Van Berkel has competed in Ironman and Ironman 70.3 events in Australia, Asia, Europe and America.

In 2014, Van Berkel debuted at the Ironman World Championship in Kona, Hawaii. He finished 7th in a time of 8:23:26.

In 2015, Van Berkel came 2nd in the Asia-Pacific Ironman Championship in Melbourne, Australia. He was narrowly beaten by Canadian-born triathlete, Jeff Symonds. In August, Van Berkel engaged Dr Daniel Plews as his new coach.

In August 2015, Van Berkel finished 2nd to fellow Australian triathlete, Tim Reed, by 2 seconds, in the Ironman 70.3 Asia-Pacific Championship held in Cebu, Philippines. Then, in September of the same year, Van Berkel won Ironman 70.3 Sunshine Coast.

Personal life 

Van Berkel lives in East Ballina, New South Wales. Van Berkel was previously married to Belinda Van Berkel with whom they have a son named Hendrix.

Professional record

References

External links
 

Australian male triathletes
1984 births
Living people
Sportspeople from Albury
Sportsmen from New South Wales
20th-century Australian people
21st-century Australian people